Kingsley is an unincorporated community in Wasco County, Oregon, United States, named by E.M. Wilson in 1878. Wilson named it for Charles Kingsley, because she had enjoyed reading his book Westward Ho!.

References

Unincorporated communities in Wasco County, Oregon
Unincorporated communities in Oregon